Byam is both a given name and a surname. Notable people with the name include:

 Byam Shaw (1872–1919), Indian-born British painter, illustrator, designer and teacher
 Edward Byam, Governor of the Leeward Islands
 Lydia Byam, (born 1772), botanical illustrator
 Sarah Byam, American comics writer
 Wally Byam (1896–1962), founder of Airstream Inc.

See also
 Byam Channel, a waterway in northern Canada
 Barrett-Byam